is a Japanese former volleyball player who competed in the 1968 Summer Olympics and in the 1972 Summer Olympics.

She was born in Inzai, Chiba.

In 1968 she was a squad member of the Japanese team which won the silver medal in the Olympic tournament.

Four years later she won her second Olympic silver medal with the Japanese team. She played all five matches.

External links
 profile

1947 births
Living people
People from Inzai
Olympic volleyball players of Japan
Volleyball players at the 1968 Summer Olympics
Volleyball players at the 1972 Summer Olympics
Olympic silver medalists for Japan
Sportspeople from Chiba Prefecture
Japanese women's volleyball players
Olympic medalists in volleyball
Asian Games medalists in volleyball
Volleyball players at the 1966 Asian Games
Medalists at the 1966 Asian Games
Asian Games gold medalists for Japan
Medalists at the 1972 Summer Olympics
Medalists at the 1968 Summer Olympics
20th-century Japanese women